St. Kizito was a coeducational boarding secondary school in Kenya in Akithii Location, Meru County. It was named for Saint Kizito.

History 
The school was established as an all-boys school in 1968 and began admitting girls in 1975.

By 1991 the school had 577 students between the ages of 14 and 18 – 306 boys and 271 girls.

Mass rapes and murders

Events 
On 13 July 1991, 71 girls were raped and 19 killed at St. Kizito school. After supposedly declining to participate in a strike organized by the boys at the school, the girls' dormitory was invaded by male students and the chaos began.

Response 
Initial reports included a statement from the deputy principal, Joyce Kithira, who said "The boys never meant any harm against the girls. They just wanted to rape." Kithira was dismissed from her position for her "failure to maintain discipline" at the school but was almost immediately reinstated. School principal James Laiboni commented that rape was a common occurrence at the school. The view was echoed by Francis Machira Apollos, a local probation officer.

The school was closed immediately after the massacre as international outrage erupted on the treatment of women in Kenya and other African nations. 39 boys were arrested in connection with the incident.

See also

 Education in Kenya
 List of schools in Kenya
 List of attacks related to secondary schools

References

 Kariuki, Caroline, W. "Masculinity and Adolescent Male Violence: The Case of Three Secondary Schools in Kenya".
  Alt URL

1991 disestablishments in Africa
20th-century disestablishments in Kenya
Boarding schools in Kenya
Co-educational boarding schools
Defunct secondary schools
Defunct schools in Kenya
Education in Eastern Province (Kenya)
Educational institutions disestablished in 1991
Mass murder in 1991
Massacres of women
Meru County
Murder in Kenya
Rape in Africa
School massacres
High schools and secondary schools in Kenya
1968 establishments in Kenya
Educational institutions established in 1968
1991 murders in Kenya
Violence against women in Kenya
Massacres in Kenya